Orange Caramel is the first subgroup of South Korean girl group After School. The subgroup was formed in 2010 with the third generation After School members Nana, Raina, and Lizzy. As of December 2019, Orange Caramel only has one member under the label. According to the group's website however, Raina and Lizzy are still members of the group.

History

2010: Debut and two mini albums 

Orange Caramel debuted on June 16, 2010, with the single "Magic Girl". Their debut mini-album, The First Mini Album was released on June 21, 2010. The album was a commercial success, peaking at No. 2 on the Gaon Chart with the lead single "Magic Girl" peaking at No. 18. "Magic Girl" was a domestic hit and became famous for its choreography and outfits featuring large bows, with the song's concept proving popular as it was often parodied on variety shows throughout 2010. The mini-album was also released in Taiwan, where a Mandarin version of "The Day You Went Away", a cover from Cyndi Wang, originally by M2M, was also included. Both versions of the album included Raina's R&B solo, "Love Does Not Wait" .

On November 18, 2010, The Second Mini Album was released with the title track "A-ing". The music video for "A-ing" had a fairy tale witches concept. The album peaked at No. 10 on the Gaon Chart and the lead single, "A-ing", peaked at No. 5. The second single released from the album, a solo by Raina titled "Not Yet..." , peaked at No. 42. The album also includes the song "One Love" and a Korean version of "The Day You Went Away" .

2011: Bangkok City and Shanghai Romance 
On March 30, "Bangkok City" was released as part of the group's "One Asia" project. The single peaked at No. 3 on the Gaon Chart, thus making it the group's most successful single to date. Orange Caramel continued the "One Asia" project with the release of "Shanghai Romance" on October 13, which peaked at No. 8. The song's lyrics were written by Kim Hee-chul of Super Junior. The single had two B-sides: "Close Your Eyes" (눈을 감아), a solo by Nana, and the Mandarin version of "The Day You Went Away". A Japanese version of "Shanghai Romance" was later released as a bonus track on After School's debut Japanese album, Playgirlz.

2012–2013: Japanese debut and Lipstick 

Orange Caramel debuted in Japan on September 5, 2012, with a cover of 1970s pop group Candies song "My Sweet Devil". They returned to Korea and released their first studio album, Lipstick on September 12. On October 23, 2012, Orange Caramel released the single "Lipstick DJ Remix". It consisted of two remixes of "Lipstick" by DJs Vodge Diper and Hanmin. Vodge Diper's remix was subsequently used in their live TV performances.

The group's first Japanese studio album, Orange Caramel, was released on March 13, 2013. It included their previous Japanese singles and Japanese versions of their Korean singles, as well as some new songs.

On May 9, 2013, Orange Caramel released a collaboration with indie band 10cm. The single is a remake of 10 cm's "Hug Me"  and is part of LOEN Entertainment's "Re;code" project. In July 2013, Orange Caramel released the book Youth Travel , which contains short essays and photos of the group visiting Seoul and Jeonju.

2014: Catallena and My Copycat 
Orange Caramel's third single, "Catallena" was released on March 12. In the music video, the group appear as mermaids before turning into different types of sushi. The song has a Bollywood-inspired disco beat and samples a Punjabi wedding folk song. The single peaked at No. 5 on Gaon's album chart and No. 6 on the digital chart, as well as No. 4 on Billboard's K-Pop Hot 100. The group's performances of the song went viral on social media sites due to the "screaming" during the introduction of the song. Orange Caramel released a promotional single, "Abing Abing", on May 20. The song was used to promote Baskin Robbins' new line of ice cream bingsoo, or patbingsu, a Korean shaved ice dessert. At the end of 2014, it was number 12 on Billboard's list of the 20 best K-pop songs of the year.

On August 18, Orange Caramel's fourth single, "My Copycat"  was released. The theme of the music video is based on Where's Waldo? and prompts viewers to find the Orange Caramel members in different scenes as well as spot the differences between similar side-by-side shots. It was directed by video production team duo Digipedi who had previously worked with the group on "Catallena" and "Lipstick". The single peaked at No. 8 on Gaon's album chart and No. 19 on the digital chart. A music video for the B-side track "The Gangnam Avenue"  was released on September 3. Later that month, the group released their first soundtrack single, "Tonight" for the television series It's Okay, That's Love.

2015–2019: Solo endeavours and Lizzy & Raina's departures
Since 2015, both After School and Orange Caramel promotions slowed down whilst members focus on individual activities. What became Orange Caramel's final concert appearance together was on April 15, 2016, at the SBS Cultwo Show Legend Concert held at the Olympic Hall; interviews at the concert revealed that they had been working on music. Raina has embarked on a solo music career, whilst Lizzy and Nana focused more on acting. On May 1, 2018, Pledis Entertainment announced that Lizzy had left After School, due to the expiration of her contract. However, they later clarified that she had not left Orange Caramel, and that if the opportunity were to arise in the future, the sub-unit would still release songs as three members. On December 27, 2019, Raina left After School and Pledis without any statement concerning her membership with Orange Caramel.

Discography

Studio albums

Extended plays

Singles

As lead artist

As featured artist

Promotional singles

Other charted songs

Other appearances

Music videos

Notes

Awards and nominations 

Seoul Music Awards

|-
| rowspan="2"| 2012
| rowspan="2"| Orange Caramel
| Bonsang Award
| 
|-
| Popularity Award
| 
|-
| rowspan="2"| 2013
| rowspan="2"| "Lipstick"
| Bonsang Award
| 
|-
| Popularity Award
| 

Melon Music Awards

|-
| 2014 
|"Catallena"
|Best Song
| 

SBS MTV Best of the Best

|-
| rowspan="2"| 2012
| "Lipstick"
| Best Comic Video
| 
|-
| Orange Caramel
| Best Rival (vs Secret)
| 

Korean Visual Arts Festival

|-
| 2010
| Orange Caramel
| Photogenic Award
| 

MTN Broadcast Advertising Award Ceremony

|-
| 2014
| Orange Caramel
| The Women CM Star Award
|

Notes

References

External links

  

 
South Korean girl groups
South Korean dance music groups
Pledis Entertainment artists
Musical groups established in 2010
K-pop music groups
2010 establishments in South Korea
Musical groups from Seoul
After School (band)